Sengunthar Engineering College is a 
private engineering college located in Kosavampalayam,  from Tiruchengode,  from Namakkal, Tamil Nadu, India. It is affiliated with Anna University. It is ranked as one of the top private institutions in India.

Inception
The college was started by the Sengunthar Charitable Trust in 2001.  It is affiliated to Anna University, Chennai.

Facilities

Library
The college has a central library with 40,000 volumes, 9,200 titles, 120 Indian periodicals and 56 international periodicals AICTE consortium online journals 601. The library has a collection of more than 1,400 CDs and floppies. A number of books for the preparation of competitive exams like GATE, TOEFL, GRE, GMAT, Defense Service and Civil Service are available in both reference and issue sections.

Physical education
 Multi-purpose standard 400 meters mud track with field measurements
 Volleyball courts with flood lights and gallery
 Table tennis boards
 Cricket ground
 Basketball, concrete court
 Ball badminton court
 Handball court
 Football field
 Hockey field

Hostel
There are in-campus hostels for boys and girls, two for boys and two for girls.

Professional societies
There are programmes on public awareness, national integration, career development, science exhibitions.

The institution is an institutional member in the following professional societies:
 Institute of Electrical and Electronics Engineers
 Indian Society for Technical Education Staff Chapter
 Indian Society for Technical Education Student Chapter
 Indian Institute of Production Engineers
 Computer Society of India

References

External links
 Official website

Engineering colleges in Tamil Nadu
Colleges affiliated to Anna University
Education in Namakkal district
Educational institutions established in 2001
2001 establishments in Tamil Nadu